Mihailo Golubović (28 December 1889 – 14 April 1941) was a Serbian and Yugoslav soldier and a brigadier general of the Royal Yugoslav Army.

Biography 
Golubović was born on 28 December 1889 in Belgrade, at that time the capital of the Kingdom of Serbia. Golubović graduated from the Military Academy, and participated in the Balkan Wars and World War I.

He earned the rank of brigadier general in 1938 and was retired in 1940.

During the German Invasion of Yugoslavia, Golubović was reactivated from retirement and placed in command of infantry of Toplice Division. He was badly wounded and evacuated to hospital where he died from his wounds on 14 April in Lebane.

References 

1889 births
1941 deaths
People from Belgrade
Serbian military personnel of the Balkan Wars
Serbian military personnel of World War I
Royal Yugoslav Army personnel of World War II
Yugoslav military personnel killed in World War II
Yugoslav generals